Nikola Trujić (born 14 April 1992) is a Serbian professional footballer who plays as a winger for Doxa Katokopias.

Club career
After coming through the youth system of Partizan, Trujić made his senior debut with Teleoptik in 2010. He was subsequently sent on loan to Smederevo (2011) and Hapoel Acre (2012), but failed to make an impact. In the summer of 2012, Trujić signed his first professional contract with Partizan, on a four-year deal. He was eventually loaned to Napredak for the 2012–13 season. In the summer of 2013, after the club's promotion to the top flight, Trujić signed a permanent contract with Napredak, on a three-year deal. On 5 June 2015, Trujić returned to his parent club Partizan. He penned a four-year contract and was given the number 92 shirt. On 17 July 2015, Trujić made his competitive debut for Partizan, coming on as a substitute for Andrija Živković in a 4–0 home league win over Metalac Gornji Milanovac. He netted his first goal for the club on 1 August 2015, scoring the opener in a 2–3 away league loss at Novi Pazar. Four days later, Trujić came on off the bench and headed in the final goal of a 4–2 home win over Steaua București in the return leg of the 2015–16 UEFA Champions League third qualifying round, as Partizan progressed to the next stage. On 19 February 2016, Trujić signed a two-and-a-half-year contract with Vojvodina. He left the club due to conflict with supporters in summer 2017. On 31 August 2017, Trujić signed a two-year-deal with the Russian side Tosno.
On 27 June 2019, Trujić signed a one-year contract with Debrecen with an optional two additional years. On 28 July 2020, he joined AEL on a two-year deal.

Career statistics

International career
Trujić represented Serbia at the 2011 UEFA Under-19 Championship. He was a member of the Serbia under-21 team at the 2015 UEFA Under-21 Championship.

Honours
Napredak Kruševac
 Serbian First League: 2012–13

Tosno
 Russian Cup: 2017–18

Notes

References

External links
 
 

1992 births
Living people
People from Bor, Serbia
Serbian footballers
Association football forwards
Serbia youth international footballers
Serbia under-21 international footballers
Serbian SuperLiga players
FK Napredak Kruševac players
FK Partizan players
FK Smederevo players
FK Teleoptik players
FK Vojvodina players
Israeli Premier League players
Hapoel Acre F.C. players
Russian Premier League players
FC Tosno players
Liga I players
FC Botoșani players
FK Voždovac players
Nemzeti Bajnokság I players
Debreceni VSC players
Super League Greece players
Athlitiki Enosi Larissa F.C. players
2. Bundesliga players
FC Erzgebirge Aue players
Serbian expatriate footballers
Serbian expatriate sportspeople in Israel
Expatriate footballers in Israel
Serbian expatriate sportspeople in Russia
Expatriate footballers in Russia 
Serbian expatriate sportspeople in Romania
Expatriate footballers in Romania
Serbian expatriate sportspeople in Hungary
Expatriate footballers in Hungary
Serbian expatriate sportspeople in Greece
Expatriate footballers in Greece
Serbian expatriate sportspeople in Germany
Expatriate footballers in Germany